Viktor Bohatyr (born 11 May 1969) is a former football player and current manager.

Career
He played for FC Dnepr Mogilev and FC Chornomorets Odesa, and he coached FC Oleksandriya, FC Hirnyk Kryvyi Rih and FC Inhulets Petrove.

External links 
 
 

1969 births
Living people
People from Oleksandriia
Soviet footballers
Ukrainian footballers
Ukrainian expatriate footballers
Expatriate footballers in Belarus
FC Dnepr Mogilev players
FC Dinamo Minsk players
FC Oleksandriya players
FC Chornomorets Odesa players
FC Kryvbas Kryvyi Rih players
FC Vorskla Poltava players
FC Vorskla-2 Poltava players
FC Kremin Kremenchuk players
FC Zirka Kropyvnytskyi players
FC Zirka-2 Kirovohrad players
FC Syhnal Odesa players
FC Torpedo Mogilev players
FC Nyva Ternopil players
FC Palmira Odesa players
Ukrainian Premier League players
Ukrainian First League players
Ukrainian Second League players
Ukrainian football managers
Ukrainian expatriate football managers
Ukrainian expatriate sportspeople in Moldova
Expatriate football managers in Moldova
FC Palmira Odesa managers
FC Hirnyk Kryvyi Rih managers
FC Oleksandriya managers
FC Nistru Otaci managers
FC Inhulets Petrove managers
NK Veres Rivne managers
FC Myr Hornostayivka managers
FC Volyn Lutsk managers
Moldovan Super Liga managers
Ukrainian First League managers
Ukrainian Second League managers
Association football midfielders
Sportspeople from Kirovohrad Oblast